John Alan Noriega (December 20, 1943 – September 29, 2001) was an American professional baseball player, a right-handed pitcher who played in 13 Major League Baseball games for the – Cincinnati Reds.

Noriega was born in Ogden, Utah to John (Jack) Noriega and Marion (Evertson) Noriega. He graduated from Davis High School in Kaysville, Utah, where he was an all-state pitcher and in basketball was a member of the 1961 state title-winning team.

He received scholarship offers from Brigham Young University and the University of Utah, which is where he went. He married Barbara Tidwell on October 1, 1965.

Selected by the Reds out of the University of Utah in the fourth round of the 1966 Major League Baseball draft (62nd overall), Noriega's Major League career (all as a relief pitcher) came in two bursts: five games in May 1969 and four games each in July and August 1970. During the latter season, the first year of the Cincinnati's "Big Red Machine" dynasty, Noriega was primarily used in middle relief during the midsummer. In one notable appearance, on August 6 against the San Francisco Giants, he threw  innings of long relief, allowing only two runs. His MLB season and career ended three days later, and he was not on the Reds' 1970 postseason squad. All told, he allowed 37 hits and 13 bases on balls with 10 strikeouts in  MLB innings.

Noriega's career in minor league baseball lasted for six seasons (1966–1971) and 229 games played.

After baseball, he worked for 25 years as a recreation therapist for Davis County Mental Health. In 1998 he founded the nonprofit organization HITE (High Impact Teaching Empowerment).

John Noriega died of a stroke at age 57 on September 29, 2001 in Layton, Utah. He was survived by his wife of 36 years, Barbara; sons John and David; daughter Kari; son-in-law Brandon Hatch; daughters-in-law Heidi and Sharlena; and six grandchildren (and one was on the way). He is buried in Kaysville.

References

External links
, or Retrosheet, or Pura Pelota

1943 births
2001 deaths
Águilas del Zulia players
Baseball players from Utah
Cincinnati Reds players
Eugene Emeralds players
Florida Instructional League Astros/Reds players
Florida Instructional League Reds players
Indianapolis Indians players
Knoxville Smokies players
Major League Baseball pitchers
Sportspeople from Ogden, Utah
Portland Beavers players
Tigres de Aragua players
American expatriate baseball players in Venezuela
University of Utah alumni
Utah Utes baseball players
People from Davis County, Utah